Ibrahim Chenihi (born January 24, 1990) is an Algerian footballer who currently plays for Saudi club Al-Ain. He plays mainly as a winger, and can play on both wings.

Career
In 2015, Chenihi signed a contract with Club Africain. In 2018, Chenihi signed a contract with Al-Fateh. In 2020, Chenihi signed a contract with Damac. In 2021, he signed a two-year contract with USM Alger. On 31 August 2022, Chenihi joined Al-Ain.

International career
Chenihi made his debut for the Algeria national team on March 26, 2015, coming on as a second half substitute in a friendly match against Qatar. Four days later, he made his first start for Algeria in a 4-1 win over Oman.

Honours
Club Africain
 Tunisian Cup (1): 2016–17

References

External links
 
 

1990 births
Living people
Algerian footballers
Algeria international footballers
Algerian expatriate footballers
Algerian Ligue Professionnelle 1 players
Tunisian Ligue Professionnelle 1 players
Saudi Professional League players
Saudi First Division League players
MC El Eulma players
People from M'Sila
WR M'Sila players
Club Africain players
Al-Fateh SC players
Damac FC players
Al-Ain FC (Saudi Arabia) players
Expatriate footballers in Tunisia
Expatriate footballers in Saudi Arabia
Algerian expatriate sportspeople in Tunisia
Algerian expatriate sportspeople in Saudi Arabia
Association football wingers
21st-century Algerian people